This is a list of World War II weapons of Yugoslavia. More specifically land weapons used by the Royal Yugoslav Army during the Axis invasion of Yugoslavia. Weapons used by the resistance groups the Yugoslav Partisans and Chetniks will not be included due to their scavenged and random nature. However if you want to place a list put a title above it saying it is for resistance forces.

Small arms

Rifles 

 M24 Rifle

Sidearms 

 FN Model 1922

Machine guns 

 ZB vz. 30

Artillery

Field guns 

 Canon de 105 mle 1913 Schneider

Heavy artillery 

 Canon de 155 C modèle 1917 Schneider

Siege artillery 

 Skoda 305 mm Model 1911

Armoured fighting vehicles(AFVs)

Tanks 

 Renault FT
 T-32 (Š-I-D)

Armoured cars 

 Peugeot armoured car

References

Yugoslavia in World War II
World War II